An election was held on November 2, 2010 to elect all 50 members to North Carolina's Senate. The election coincided with the elections for other offices, U.S Senate, U.S. House of Representatives, and state house. The primary election was held on May 4, 2010 with a run-off on June 22, 2010.

Results summary

Incumbents defeated in general election
Donald G. Davis (D-District 5), defeated by Louis Pate (R)
A. B. Swindell (D-District 11), defeated by Buck Newton (R)
Margaret Dickson (D-District 19), defeated by Wesley Meredith (R)
Anthony "Tony" Foriest (D-District 24), defeated by Rick Gunn (R)
Steve Goss (D-District 45), defeated by Dan Soucek (R)
Joe Sam Queen (D-District 47), defeated by Ralph Hise (R)
John Snow (D-District 50), defeated by Jim Davis (R)

Open seats that changed parties
R. C. Soles Jr. (D-District 8) didn't seek re-election, seat won by Bill Rabon (R)
Julia Boseman (D-District 9) didn't seek re-election, seat won by Thom Goolsby (R)
Charles Albertson (D-District 10) didn't seek re-election, seat won by Brent Jackson (R)
David Hoyle (D-District 43) didn't seek re-election, seat won by Kathy Harrington (R)

Detailed Results

Districts 1-25

District 1
Incumbent Democratic President Pro Tempore Marc Basnight has represented the 1st district since 1985.

District 2
Incumbent Republican Jean Preston has represented the 2nd district since 2007.

District 3
Incumbent Democrat Clark Jenkins has represented the 3rd district since 2003.

District 4
Incumbent Democrat Ed Jones has represented the 4th district since 2007.

District 5
Incumbent Democrat Donald G. Davis has represented the 5th district since 2009.  In a rematch of the 2008 election, Davis was defeated for re-election by Republican Louis Pate.

District 6
Incumbent Republican Harry Brown has represented the 6th district since 2005.

District 7
Incumbent Democrat Doug Berger has represented the 7th district since 2005.

District 8
Incumbent Democrat R. C. Soles Jr. has represented the 8th district and its predecessors since 1977.  Soles didn't seek re-election and Republican Bill Rabon won the open seat.

District 9
Incumbent Democrat Julia Boseman has represented the 9th district since 2005.  Boseman didn't seek re-election and instead ran for New Hanover County District Court Judge. Republican Thom Goolsby won the open seat.

District 10
Incumbent Democrat Charles Albertson has represented the 10th district and its predecessors since 1993.  Albertson didn't seek re-election and Republican Brent Jackson won the open seat.

District 11
Incumbent Democrat A.B. Swindell has represented the 11th district since 2001.  Swindell was defeated for re-election by Republican Buck Newton.

District 12
Incumbent Republican David Rouzer has represented the 12th district since 2009.

District 13
Incumbent Democrat Michael Walters has represented the 13th district since 2009.

District 14
Incumbent Democrat Dan Blue has represented the 14th district since 2009.

District 15
Incumbent Republican Neal Hunt has represented the 15th district since 2005.

District 16
Incumbent Democrat Josh Stein has represented the 16th district since 2009.

District 17
Incumbent Republican Richard Stevens has represented the 17th district since 2003.

District 18
Incumbent Democrat Bob Atwater has represented the 18th district since 2005.

District 19
Incumbent Democrat Margaret Dickson has represented the 19th district since 2010.

District 20
Incumbent Democrat Floyd McKissick Jr. has represented the 20th district since 2007.

District 21
Incumbent Democrat Larry Shaw has represented the 21st district and its predecessors since 1995.  Shaw didn't seek re-election and Democrat Eric Mansfield won the open seat.

District 22
Incumbent Republican Harris Blake has represented the 22nd district since 2003.

District 23
Incumbent Democrat Eleanor Kinnaird has represented the 23rd district and its predecessors since 1997.

District 24
Incumbent Democrat Anthony "Tony" Foriest has represented the 24th district since 2007.  He was defeated for re-election by Republican Rick Gunn.

District 25
Incumbent Democrat Bill Purcell has represented the 25th district and its predecessors since 1997.

Districts 26-50

District 26
Incumbent Republican Minority Leader Phil Berger has represented the 26th district since and its predecessors since 2001.

District 27
Incumbent Democrat Don Vaughan has represented the 27th district since 2009.

District 28
Incumbent Democrat Katie G. Dorsett has represented the 28th district since 2003.  Dorsett didn't seek re-election and Democrat Gladys Robinson won the open seat.

District 29
Incumbent Republican Jerry Tillman has represented the 29th district since 2003

District 30
Incumbent Republican Don East has represented the 30th district since 2005.

District 31
Incumbent Republican Pete Brunstetter has represented the 31st district since 2006.

District 32
Incumbent Democrat Linda Garrou has represented the 32nd district and its predecessors since 1999.

District 33
Incumbent Republican Stan Bingham has represented the 33rd district and its predecessors since 2001.

District 34
Incumbent Republican Andrew Brock has represented the 34th district since 2003.

District 35
Incumbent Republican W. Edward Goodall has represented the 35th district since 2005.  Goodall didn't seek re-election and Republican Tommy Tucker won the open seat.

District 36
Incumbent Republican Fletcher L. Hartsell Jr. has represented the 36th district and its predecessors since 1991.

District 37
Incumbent Democrat Dan Clodfelter has represented the 37th district and its predecessors since 1999.

District 38
Incumbent Democrat Charlie Dannelly has represented the 38th district and its predecessors since 1995.

District 39
Incumbent Republican Bob Rucho has represented the 39th district and its predecessors since 2008 and previously from 1997 to 2005.

District 40
Incumbent Democrat Maclom Graham has represented the 40th district since 2005.

District 41
Incumbent Republican James Forrester has represented the 41st district and its predecessors since 1991.

District 42
Incumbent Republican Austin Allran has represented the 42nd district and its predecessors since 1987.

District 43
Incumbent Democrat David W. Hoyle has represented the 43rd district and its predecessors since 1993.  Hoyle didn't seek re-election and Republican Kathy Harrington won the open seat.

District 44
Incumbent Republican Jim Jacumin has represented the 44th district since 2005.  Jacumin didn't seek re-election and Republican Warren Daniel won the open seat.

District 45
Incumbent Democrat Steve Goss has represented the 45th district since 2007.  Goss was defeated for re-election by Republican Dan Soucek.

District 46
Incumbent Republican Debbie Clary has represented the 46th district since 2009

District 47
Incumbent Democrat Joe Sam Queen has represented the 47th district since 2007, and previously from 2003 to 2005.  Queen was defeated for re-election by Republican Ralph Hise.

District 48
Incumbent Republican Tom Apodaca has represented the 48th district since 2003.

District 49
Incumbent Democratic Majority Leader Martin Nesbitt has represented the 49th district since 2004.

District 50
Incumbent Democrat John Snow has represented the 50th district since 2005. He was defeated for re-election by Republican Jim Davis.

See also
 2010 North Carolina elections

References

North Carolina senate
senate
2010